Azasetron is an antiemetic which acts as a 5-HT3 receptor antagonist, pKi = 9.27  It is used in the management of nausea and vomiting induced by cancer chemotherapy (such as cisplatin chemotherapy). Azasetron hydrochloride is given in a usual dose of 10 mg once daily by mouth or intravenously. It is approved for marketing in Japan, and marketed exclusively by Torii Pharmaceutical Co., Ltd. under the trade names "Serotone I.V. Injection 10 mg" and "Serotone Tablets 10 mg".  Pharmacokinetics data from S. Tsukagoshi. 

R-azasetron besylate (SENS-401) has been studied to prevent hearing loss related to sudden sensorineural hearing loss (SSNHL), acoustic trauma, and cisplatin-induced ototoxicity.

References 

5-HT3 antagonists
Morpholines
Quinuclidines
Lactams
Chlorobenzenes
Salicylamide ethers
Cyclic ethers